Punch Jan Masenamela (born 17 October 1986) is a South African footballer who currently plays for Mamelodi Sundowns and South Africa as a defender.

International career
Born in Bochum, Transvaal, Masenamela made his debut for South Africa in 2010.

References

1986 births
Living people
People from Blouberg Local Municipality
Sportspeople from Limpopo
Northern Sotho people
South African soccer players
South Africa international soccer players
Association football defenders
Kaizer Chiefs F.C. players
Mamelodi Sundowns F.C. players
Platinum Stars F.C. players
Polokwane City F.C. players
Baroka F.C. players
South African Premier Division players